"Komodo (Hard Nights)" is a song by German dance band R.I.O., featuring vocals from Pop, R&B and Hip-Hop singer U-Jean. The song was released in Germany as a digital download on 27 September 2013. The song has charted in Austria, Germany and Switzerland. The song was written by Gianfranco Bortolotti, Mauro Picotto, Andrea Remondini and Riccardo Ferri.

Content
The song samples Italian trance producer Mauro Picotto's song, "Komodo (Save a Soul)".

Music video
A music video to accompany the release of "Komodo (Hard Nights)" was first released onto YouTube on 27 September 2013 at a total length of three minutes and twenty-six seconds.

Track listing

Chart performance

Weekly charts

Release history

References

2013 singles
R.I.O. songs
2013 songs
Kontor Records singles
Songs written by Gianfranco Bortolotti